Galuconitic Sandstone may refer to:

 A subunit of the Mannville Group
 Glauconitic Sandstone more generally, a type of greensand

Geologic formations of Alberta
Sandstone formations
Western Canadian Sedimentary Basin
Cretaceous Alberta